Harrison Candelaria Fletcher is an American journalist and author. In 2013 his book Descanso for My Father: Fragments of a Life received a bronze medal for non-fiction in the Independent Publisher Book Awards, and also a Colorado Book Award for non-fiction. The book is a memoir of his father, who died when the author was a baby. His second book, Presentimiento: A Life in Dreams, is about his mother.

Publications 

 Descanso for My Father: Fragments of a Life. Lincoln: University of Nebraska Press, 2012. .
 Presentimiento: A Life in Dreams. Pittsburgh : Autumn House Press, 2016. .

References 

Living people
21st-century American male writers
21st-century American non-fiction writers
Year of birth missing (living people)